Luigi Ciavarro is an Italian film actor.

He played a member of Angel Eye's gang in The Good, the Bad and the Ugly (1966) alongside Benito Stefanelli, Aldo Sambrell and Romano Puppo, Flagstone deputy alongside Giorgio Trestini in C'era una volta il West (1968), both directed by Sergio Leone, and Turone in Battle of the Amazons (1973). He worked as the fight choreographer in Vulcan, Son of Giove (1962).

Filmography

References

External links
 
 

Date of birth unknown
Italian male film actors
Italian stunt performers
Action choreographers
Swordfighters